Chicago and State Line Railway may refer to:
Chicago and State Line Railway (1878–1879), predecessor of the Grand Trunk Western Railroad
Chicago and State Line Railway (1905), predecessor of the Chicago and North Western Railway
Chicago and State Line Railroad (1887–1923), predecessor of the New York, Chicago and St. Louis Railroad